Federal Court of Appeals may refer to:

Federal Court of Appeal (Canada)
United States Court of Appeals for the Federal Circuit